Série 1150 are small Sentinel shunting locomotives (with diesel-hydraulic engines built by Rolls-Royce) built in 1966-1967 for Portuguese Railways (CP). They are based on the "Steelman" shunting locomotive used at various industrial plants arounds the UK. They have a maximum speed of 58 km/h. As of 2012, seven locomotives remain in service.

References

Diesel locomotives of Portugal
Railway locomotives introduced in 1966
Sentinel locomotives